Joseph Fitzgerald may refer to:

Joseph Fitzgerald (ice hockey) (1904–1987), American ice hockey player
Joseph D. FitzGerald (1899–?), 3rd President of Fairfield University
Joseph Dennis Fitzgerald (1936–2001), American freestyle wrestler and football player and coach
Joseph John Fitzgerald (1887–1973), Australian politician
Joe Fitzgerald (coin designer), American coin designer
Joe Fitzgerald (American football) (1899–1978), NFL player
Joe Fitzgerald (baseball) (1897–1967), American baseball player
Joe Fitzgerald (handballer) (born 1971), American handball player
Joe Fitzgerald (politician) (1912–1985), Australian politician